Bhatnagar International School, Vasant Kunj is a private school located in sector B, Pocket 10, Vasant Kunj, India. It was founded by Dr. V.K Bhatnagar in 1990. The school has several other branches including Bhatnagar International School, Paschim Vihar, Manav Sthali School, New Rajender Nagar. It is affiliated with CBSE. The principal of the school is Mrs. Shilpa Bhatnagar.

The school was recognised with an International School Award by the British Council in 2021.

Facilities

Campus 

The school is divided into 2 campuses the senior campus and the junior campus

References 

http://Bhatnagarinternationalschool.in

External links
 http://bhatnagarinternationalschool.in

Schools in Delhi
South West Delhi district
Educational institutions established in 1990
1990 establishments in Delhi